Prem Singh Brahma (1952 – 2007) was the former leader of the Bodo Liberation Tigers Force and deputy chief from 1994 to 1996. He later renounced violence and joined the Congress party.

External links
Bodo leader Prem Singh Brahma dead Times of India - 17 April 2007

1952 births
2007 deaths
People from Chirang district
Bodo people
Indian National Congress politicians from Karnataka